Tösse IF is a Swedish football club located in Tösse.

External links
 Tösse IF – Official Site

Footnotes

Football clubs in Västra Götaland County